"Oom-Pah-Pah" is a song from the musical Oliver!.

Oom-Pah-Pah may also refer to:
 Oom-pah, rhythmical sounds of brass instruments in a band
 Oumpah-pah, a comic strip